Elections to Warwick District Council took place on Thursday 7 May 2015, with votes counted and declared on Saturday 9 May 2015.

A total of 46 seats were up for election, all councillors from all wards. The previous elections produced a majority for the Conservative Party. The boundaries of many of the wards across the District were changed from the previous election.

Election result

Ward results

References

2015 English local elections
May 2015 events in the United Kingdom
2015
2010s in Warwickshire